Protobactrites is an extinct nautiloid cephalopod belonging to the Orthoceratoidea that lived in what would be Europe and Asia during the Ordovician and Silurian from 466–421.3 mya, existing for approximately .

Taxonomy
Protobactrites, named by Hyatt in Zittel (1900), is an orthocerid of unknown familial affiliation where it was retained by Sepkoski (2002). In spite of the name, Protobactrites has no known relationship to the Bactritida

Morphology
Protobactrites is characterized by a long slender orthoconic or faintly curved longiconic shell with a circular or subcircular cross section, transverse sutures, long body chamber and oblique aperture. The siphuncle is eccentric; exact structure unknown. The surface has transverse and in some species longitudinal striae. Adult shells may be naturally truncated.

Nothing is known of the living animal which may have had eight or ten arms, and tentacles, like modern coleoids such as modern squid and octopus.

Fossil distribution
Fossil distribution is exclusive to Europe and eastern Asia.

References

Prehistoric nautiloid genera
Ordovician cephalopods
Silurian cephalopods
Silurian extinctions
Prehistoric animals of Europe
Paleozoic animals of Asia